Operating System/Virtual Storage 2 (OS/VS2) is the successor operating system to OS/360 MVT in the OS/360 family.

SVS refers to OS/VS2 Release 1 
MVS refers to OS/VS2 Release 2 and later

IBM mainframe operating systems